Lintan County is an administrative district in Gansu, the People's Republic of China. It is one of 58 counties of Gansu. It is part of the Gannan Prefecture. Its postal code is 747500, and in 1999 its population was 148,722 people.

Tibetans of Taozhou helped crush the Muslim rebels in the Dungan revolt (1895–1896) like they did in the 1781 Jahriyya revolt. The loyalist Muslims of Táozhōu also fight against the Muslim rebels and Muslim rebel leader Ma Yonglin's entire family was executed.

Muslim sect leader Ma Qixi's Muslim Xidaotang repulsed and defeated Bai Lang's bandit forces, who looted the city of Táozhōu but Muslim general Ma Anliang slaughtered Muslim sect leader Ma Qixi and his family after the war. The bandits were notable for anti-Muslim sentiment, massacring thousands of Muslims at Taozhou. Muslim Khufiyya Sufi general Ma Anliang was only concerned with defending Lanzhou and his own home base in Hezhou (Linxia) in central Gansu where his followers lived and not the rival Xidaotang sect Muslims under Muslim leader Ma Qixi in southern Gansu's minor towns like Taozhou so he let Bai Lang ravage Taozhou and other towns in southern Gansu while passively defending Lanzhou and Hezhou. The North China Herald and Reginald Farrer accused Ma Anliang of betraying his fellow Muslims by letting them get slaighterd at Taozhou. Ma Anliang then arrested Ma Qixi after falsely accusing him of striking a deal with Bai Lang and had Ma Qixi and his family slaughtered.

Administrative divisions
Lintan County (临潭县)is divided to 11 towns and 5 townships.
Towns

Townships

Climate

See also
 List of administrative divisions of Gansu

References

Lintan County
Gannan Tibetan Autonomous Prefecture